Live From the Relapse Contamination Festival is a live album by High on Fire. It was recorded during the 2003 Contamination Festival, and originally released in a limited quantity of 2,000 in 2005. The album was later re-released in 2009, long after High on Fire had officially left Relapse Records.

Track listing
All tracks by High on Fire except where noted
"Blood From Zion" - 5:00
"To Cross the Bridge" - 5:43
"Nemesis" - 3:38
"Razorhoof" - 2:45 
"Speedwolf" - 4:30
"Eyes & Teeth" - 4:13
"Hung, Drawn, & Quartered" - 4:17
"Witching Hour"  (Venom cover) - 3:47 (Lant, Dunn, Bray)

Credits
Matt Pike - guitar, vocals
Des Kensel - drums
Joe Preston - bass
Matthew F. Jacobson - Executive Producer 
Mike Mullin - mastering
Orion Landau - artwork

References

High on Fire albums
2005 live albums
Relapse Records live albums